The Moseley Homestead (also known as The Nest) is a historic home in Brandon, Florida. Built in 1886 it is located at 1820 West Brandon Boulevard. On January 31, 1985, it was added to the U.S. National Register of Historic Places.

References

External links
 Hillsborough County listings at National Register of Historic Places
 Hillsborough County listings at Florida's Office of Cultural and Historical Programs

National Register of Historic Places in Hillsborough County, Florida